Gabriel Eduardo Silva Vignoli (born April 7, 1989), is a lawyer, university professor and Panamanian politician, currently serving as a Congressman in The National Assembly of Panama representing the 8-7 Circuit as an Independent politician.

Biography
Gabriel Silva obtained a bachelor's degree in Law and Political Sciences from Universidad Católica Santa María La Antigua in 2011, where he would also later obtain a master's degree in Higher Education and was appointed as a Professor. While he was studying he was elected President of the Law Student's Association and the Federation of University Students. After graduating, he worked as a legal manager for Procter & Gamble for five years.

In 2016, as a Chevening Scholarship scholar he obtained a master's degree in Public Policy from the Blavatnik School of Government of the Oxford University in United Kingdom. In 2017, as part of the Fulbright Program, he obtained a master's degree in Laws from Columbia University in New York City, United States. He is also a Lee Kuan Yew Senior Fellow from the National University of Singapore.

In February 2018, he announced his intention to run as an Independent Candidate for a seat at the National Assembly of Panama. After months of collecting signatures, and reaching the amount required by the National Electoral Tribunal he became an official candidate for the Assembly. He was the Independent pre-candidate for the 8-7 Circuit with most signatures and less expenses.

Elected as a Congressman for The National Assembly of Panama in the 2019 Panamanian general election with 17,471 votes for the 8-7 circuit, which corresponds to the Ancón, Betania, Bella Vista, Calidonia, Curundú, El Chorrillo, Pueblo Nuevo, Santa Ana and San Felipe jurisdictions. He was the second most voted independent candidate for congress in the country. During his term as a Congressman, he has presented many anti-corruption proposals, pro transparency, education reforms, mental health law, among others.

References

External links 

1989 births
Living people
Columbia Law School alumni
Alumni of the University of Oxford